Bakifa,, is a  local authority  situated in Rashaya District, Lebanon.

History
In 1838, Eli Smith noted  Bekiyifeh's population as being Druze and "Greek" Christians.

References

Bibliography

External links
Bakkifa, localiban

Populated places in Rashaya District
Druze communities in Lebanon